Stelzner is a German surname. Notable people with the surname include:

Alfred Stelzner (1852–1906), German composer and string instrument designer
Friedrich Stelzner (1921–2020), German surgeon, scientist, and educator
Michael Stelzner, American writer

German-language surnames